Latifabad is a township in the southern suburbs of the city of Hyderabad, in Sindh, Pakistan.

History 
Latifabad is named after the renowned Sindhi Sufi poet, Shah Abdul Latif Bhittai. Its initial denizens were Sindhi but after communal uprisings in 1980s between Sindhi speaking and Urdu speaking people and some other after which many sindhis migrated to nearby area (qasimabad); The majority of Urdu and Sindhi speaking people live here, It was populated as an extension to the city of Hyderabad to settle hundreds of thousands of Muslim refugees  from India escaping from anti-Muslim pogroms, along with the town of Qasimabad.

The locals that settled the town at its start were racially of a mixed population but as the city experienced its worst traditional demonstrations between Sindhis and Muhajirs in the 1980s, the city was divided into two sub parts Sindhi settling the town of Qasimabad and the Urdu speaking took over Latifabad

Serving an ethnic majority of the Urdu speaking and Sindhi speaking community, Latifabad is further divided into units (from 1 till 12) To this date, the classification continues yet people prefer using the numbered units, major political parties in Latifabad are PTI, MQM, PSP, PPP

Language 
Latifabad has a large number of Urdu speaking people which are about 55% of the 672,504 population. 40% Sindhi speaking peoples & 5% Others Ethnic Population.

Settlement

Latifabad is divided into twelve units, instead of blocks, each numbered. Each unit has its own hospital and number of schools along with residential complexes or area.

Climate 
Latifabad has a hot desert climate with warm conditions year-round. The period from mid-march to late June is the hottest of the year, with highs peaking in May at 48 °C. During this time, winds that blow usually bring along clouds of dust, and mostly people prefer staying indoors in the daytime, while at night weather is more pleasant for this reason latifabad is considered a God gifted city, At night people usually go outside for walk and enjoy  . Winters are warm, with highs around 25 °C, though lows can often drop below 10 °C at night. On 7 June 1991 the highest temperature of 48.5 °C was recorded, while the lowest temperature of 1 °C (34 °F) was recorded on 8 February 2012.

Administrative division 
Latifabad is classified into 12 Administrative divisions in number from 1 to 12. Each number has a chairman which is elected through local body elections which solve the local issue of the related people of this unit.

Economy 
There are Handicraft industries, including silver and gold work, ornamented silks, and embroidered leather saddles, etc. are also well established. Latifabad produces almost all of the ornamental glass or metal bangles.

IT 
Latifabad plays important role in educating people in the field of IT not only in town but also in city there are many centres like Aptech Ureka, FAITH College, Chambers, Arena, horizon and many others are providing quality education to students. Two big mobile and computer markets are there in latifabad Chiragh complex, Tayyab complex where every new technology is available in different variety. NIC (National Incubation Center) is established for youngsters to startup their own business.

Food 
People of Latifabad are fond of spicy foods, fast food and sweet dishes also. There is a food street in Latifabad no 8 where every type of food is available like fast food and specially biryani which is the most common food available in the markets as well as corners of roads. It is estimated that there are 150+ shops of biryani of different taste.

Art council 
Latifabad has an art council in no 7. Where people of city and also performers from other cities performs . School annual functions, stage dramas, motivational speech by famous speakers also delivered in this council.

Sports 
Afzaal ground in latifabad no 10 is grass covered and well equipped ground which provides people of the area a good place for recreations there is a big badminton hall and a cricket ground where Regional and local matches are played there and special matches like Ramzan night tournaments are also live telecasted and also Mehboob ground latifabad no 5 has large area to play and this is famous ground of Latifabad due to its maintenance.

Healthcare and educational services 
The largest mental asylum or hospital for the mentally ill in Pakistan (some people deem it the largest in Asia) named after Sir Cowasji Jehangir Readymoney (1812–1878), civil engineer and master constructor of Bombay, the Jehangir Institute of Psychiatry holds ground in Latifabad unit 3, commonly known to the locals as Giddu Bandar.

Other hospitals in Latifabad include the St. Elizabeth's Hospital, Majee Hospital, Bhittai Hospital and Red Crescent (Hilal-e-Ahmar) Hospital, Al-Shifa Eyesight Hospital, Life care Hospital etc.

The Board of Intermediate Secondary Education, Hyderabad, the body of the Government administering the educational standards in the city has their headquarters housed in unit 9 in Latifabad. Public School Hyderabad founded in 1961 one of the most famous schools in sindh is located in Latifabad unit 3 and have so many private and Government school and Colleges in latifabad.

Other notable places 
 The most famous Pharmacy named Sheikh Medical and General Store just in front of the sabzi mandi (Naya pull).
 Unit 7 Pony sath, one of the most famous places where bridge connects to all units and city, and the house of late Sheikh Nizamuddin Siddiqui, owner of one of the biggest glass industry of Pakistan Indus Glass Industry, is situated there.
 Unit 8 has a bazaar-shopping center called Siddiqui Centre that sells clothes, shoes and bangles, product native to the city. Visitors and shoppers alike visit unit 8 before Eid to buy clothes and gifts. Units in Latifabad has its own administrative unit which works under the Hyderabad District Administration.
 Mohatta House is situated in Latifabad U6D in the vicinity of the district nazim's house. It is over 100 years old
 Unit 6 also is the home to the Hyderabad Board of Education, who have built a stadium to commemorate its presence. Most of the inter-school and -collegiate tournaments are played. There is one very big pharmacy Zeeshan Medical Store in Unit No. 5, Latifabad Hyderabad in front of Shah Abdul Bhitai Hospital. Mostly Play Grounds of Hyderabad district are situated in Latifabad like Baagh-e-Mustafa Ground Unit no. 8, Mehboob Ground in Unit no. 5, Afzaal Ground in Unit no. 10 and Degree Boys College Ground, Unit No. 11, Latifabad Hyderabad in front of naeem hospital. Government Boys Degree College and Ghazali College and Mostly Play Ground of Unit No 11 others.

References 

 

Neighbourhoods of Hyderabad, Sindh